Ruchill Park is a public park in Ruchill, Glasgow, Scotland, approximately  north-west of the city centre. It is adjacent to the former location of Ruchill Hospital on Bilsland Drive.

History

In 1892, Glasgow Corporation acquired the site of Ruchill Park for the construction of Ruchill Hospital.

Facilities

Ruchill Park has a wide range of facilities, including:

Jogging trails
Play areas
Flowerbeds
Conservation areas
Disc golf (12 hole course)

As well as this, the park features a small hillock with a flagpole (lit when it is dark) which has one of the best possible viewpoints of the whole city and surrounding area.

Events

Each Saturday at 9:30am the park hosts Ruchill parkrun, a free weekly 5km (3.1 mi) run

References

External links
Map of Ruchill Park
https://www.glasgowdiscgolfclub.co.uk/
Glasgow Council Park Information

Parks and commons in Glasgow